Thomas Wardley (5 September 1897 – 13 February 1967) was an Australian rules footballer who played with Essendon in the Victorian Football League (VFL).

Notes

External links 

1897 births
1967 deaths
Australian rules footballers from Victoria (Australia)
Essendon Football Club players
Australian military personnel of World War I